The Women's 50 metre rifle three positions shooting event at the 2015 Pan American Games will be held on July 18 at the Pan Am Shooting Centre in Innisfil.

The event consisted of two rounds: a qualifier and a final. In the qualifier, each shooter fired 60 shots with a .22 Long Rifle at 50 metres distance. 20 shots were fired each from the standing, kneeling, and prone positions. Scores for each shot were in increments of 1, with a maximum score of 10.

The top 8 shooters in the qualifying round moved on to the final round. There, they fired an additional 10 shots, all from the standing position. These shots scored in increments of .1, with a maximum score of 10.9. The total score from all 70 shots was used to determine final ranking.

The winners of all fifteen events, along with the runner up in the men's air rifle, skeet, trap and both women's rifle events will qualify for the 2016 Summer Olympics in Rio de Janeiro, Brazil (granted the athlete has not yet earned a quota for their country).

Schedule
All times are Central Standard Time (UTC-6).

Results

Qualification round
Results.

A1 .- 2 Points penalty. ISSF rules 6.11.1.1 L.
A2 .- 2 Points penalty. ISSF rules 6.11.8.3

Final

References

Shooting at the 2015 Pan American Games
Pan